The flag of the Donetsk Region, often referred to as the flag of Donbas, is the official flag of the Ukrainian region of Donetsk. It was designed by Nina Shcherbak, a Donetsk artist. The flag was officially adopted on 17 August 1999.

The flag has proportions of 3:2, and is divided into two areas.  In the upper part, there is a rising gold sun with 12 sunbeams in the upper steel blue part of flag (resembling the sky). In the lower black part (resembling the Donets Coal Basin) there are five gold ovals one under another (the reflection of the sun on the surface).

Trivia
Climbers from the Donetsk Region have set the flag at Shishapangma peak (on 27 May 2007), Hoverla (on 9 January 2007), Mont Blanc (on 22 March 2007), Elbrus (on 25 May 2007) and Everest (on 27 May 2008). In 2007 an ascent was made in order to honour the 75th anniversary of the Donetsk Region. On Saturday, 19 May 2012 Vitaly Kutniy, a mine foreman from "Belozerska" mine, climbed Mount Everest and planted the flag of the Donetsk Region.

It is the only flag of the Ukrainian Oblast that does not contain an element of the coat of arms.

Local adaptations

History

Donetsk Oblast 
On June 29, 1999, the governor announced a competition for the design of regional symbols, in which approximately 200 designs were submitted. Project No. 98, proposed by the Donetsk artist Nina Grigorievna Szczerbak turned out to be victorious. It was approved at the meeting of the regional council on August 17, 1999. As the author recalls, one of the conditions of the competition was to maintain a visual resemblance to the already existing symbols of Donetsk. In 2006, the flag was criticized by Igor Sychevuk for its pro-Ukrainian appearance. Sychev suggested accepting the International Movement of Donbass tricolor instead. Szczerbak, however, stated that it was criticized due to its resemblance to the Russian Air Force flag and added that both interpretations were incorrect because the only inspiration was the nature of the region. The flag was used by pro-Russian protesters in 2014, but since the DPR's declaration of independence, its use in separatist-controlled territory has ceased. The flag is used in the emblem of the Ukrainian Donbas Battalion.

Donetsk–Krivoy Rog Soviet Republic 

The common red flag of the revolution was used as the flag of the DKSR. The red color of the flag was to symbolize the shed blood of workers and peasants in the fight against autocracy.

Donetsk–Krivoy Rog was supposed to use a red flag with a white-green-black canton (in the colors of the Bachmut coat of arms). This is just a theory and there is no reliable evidence for this.

See also

References

  Flags of the World website - Donets'ka oblast'

Flags of Ukraine
Flag
Donetsk